The Peaceful Age is a 1974 Italian drama film written and directed by Fabio Carpi. It was screened in the International Critics' Week at the 1975 Cannes Film Festival.

Plot

Cast 
 O. E. Hasse as Simone
 Macha Méril as Elsa
 Georges Wilson as "The Other"
 Alberto Lionello as Glauco
 Isa Danieli as Sabina
 Lina Polito as  Stiratrice 
 Ernesto Colli as Imbianchino

References

External links

1974 films
1974 drama films
Italian drama films
1970s Italian-language films
Films directed by Fabio Carpi
1970s Italian films